Georgi Slavev Markov (20 January 1972 – 18 February 2018) was a  Bulgarian footballer who played as a defender. He was known as a tough, but generally fair tackler, and was nicknamed the "Börner Grater".

Career
Markov was born in Gotse Delchev, near the border with Greece. His career began at the local club Pirin, but he was only 21 when he moved to the very successful Bulgarian club Botev Plovdiv. He played for Botev in the Bulgarian A PFG between 1993 and 1996.

In June 1996 Georgi moved to Lokomotiv Sofia. After that he played for Levski Sofia, Turkish Trabzonspor and Greek side Ergotelis. Signed again with Lokomotiv Sofia in 2006.

Between 1999 and 2005, Georgi Markov played in 36 matches for Bulgaria. He scored his only goal for Bulgaria on 9 June 1999 in the 1:1 home draw against England in a Euro 2000 qualifier.

On 2 July 2011, he played in an exhibition match for Loko Sofia against his former club Levski Sofia, which marked the end of his professional career.

International goal

Honours
Levski Sofia
 Bulgarian League (2): 2000–01, 2001–02
 Bulgarian Cup (3): 2001–02, 2002–03, 2004–05

Health problems and death
In 2015 Markov suffered a heart attack whilst in Antalya on a training camp with Lokomotiv Sofia. On 18 February 2018, he died at his home aged 46 from a second heart attack.

References

External links

 Profile at LevskiSofia.info

1972 births
2018 deaths
Bulgarian footballers
Bulgaria international footballers
Bulgarian expatriate footballers
PFC Pirin Gotse Delchev players
People from Gotse Delchev
Botev Plovdiv players
FC Lokomotiv 1929 Sofia players
PFC Levski Sofia players
Trabzonspor footballers
Ergotelis F.C. players
First Professional Football League (Bulgaria) players
Süper Lig players
Expatriate footballers in Turkey
Expatriate footballers in Greece
Association football defenders
Sportspeople from Blagoevgrad Province